Albert Grigg (May 9, 1873 – October 24, 1959) was an Ontario merchant and political figure. He represented Algoma in the Legislative Assembly of Ontario as a Conservative member from 1908 to 1915. He stepped down in 1915 to become deputy minister of the Department of Lands, Forests and Mines.

He was born in Huron County, Ontario, the son of William Grigg, and educated in Bruce Mines. He married Jane Rowe. Grigg served as reeve for Plummer Township and was mayor of Bruce Mines for 37 years.

He was known by his party as the "tall, silver tongued orator".

He died in 1959.

References 

 Canadian Parliamentary Guide, 1915, EJ Chambers

External links 
Member's parliamentary history for the Legislative Assembly of Ontario
Bruce Mines Heritage, AM Henderson

1873 births
1959 deaths
Progressive Conservative Party of Ontario MPPs
Mayors of places in Ontario
Canadian Methodists
19th-century Methodists
Canadian merchants
People from Algoma District